Leonard J. Kosmalski (born November 21, 1951) is a retired American basketball player.  He played collegiately at the University of Tennessee and professionally for the National Basketball Association's Kansas City Kings.

Kosmalski, a 7-foot center from Maple Heights High School in Ohio, was a three-year starter for the Tennessee Volunteers and a three-time first team All-Southeastern Conference pick and was a starter on the Vols' 1972 SEC championship team.  For his college career, Kosmalski averaged 17.7 points and 8.4 rebounds per game.  During the 2012–13 season, Kosmalski was named an SEC legend as a part of the 2013 SEC tournament.

Following the close of his college career, Kosmalski was drafted in both the 1974 NBA draft by the Kansas City–Omaha Kings (24th pick overall), and by the Utah Stars in the American Basketball Association Draft (20th overall).  Kosmalski played parts of two seasons for the Kings, averaging 1.4 points and 1.9 rebounds in 76 games.  He then played a season in Italy for Stella Azzurra Roma.

His son Landry Kosmalski is the current head basketball coach at Swarthmore College.

References

External links
Italian League profile

1951 births
Living people
American expatriate basketball people in Italy
American men's basketball players
Basketball players from Cleveland
Centers (basketball)
Kansas City Kings draft picks
Kansas City Kings players
Parade High School All-Americans (boys' basketball)
Tennessee Volunteers basketball players
Utah Stars draft picks